Leptobrachella parva (sometimes known as the Gunung Mulu Borneo frog) is a species of amphibians in the family Megophryidae. It is endemic to Borneo and found in Sarawak and Sabah, Malaysia. Its natural habitats are tropical moist lowland forests and rivers.
It is locally abundant but threatened by habitat loss.

References

parva
Amphibians of Malaysia
Endemic fauna of Malaysia
Endemic fauna of Borneo
Amphibians described in 1984
Taxonomy articles created by Polbot
Amphibians of Borneo